Omar Dajani is a Palestinian-American professor and former member of the Palestine Liberation Organization's Negotiations Support Unit.

Dajani was born in Texas in 1970. He received his B.A. from Northwestern University in Illinois and his J.D. from Yale Law School.

In 1999, he left the United States to join the Palestine Liberation Organization's Negotiations Support Unit, where he worked as a senior legal advisor to the Palestinian negotiating team. In 2001, Dajani left his post at the PLO to take a position as a political advisor to United Nations Special Envoy Terje Rød-Larsen, which he held until 2003.

Dajani is currently a Professor of Law at the University of the Pacific's McGeorge School of Law in Sacramento, California.

See also
 Rana Dajani

References
 Profile of Omar Dajani at the Institute for Middle East Understanding
 Biography of Omar Dajani at Brit Tzedek v'Shalom
 University of California - Hastings College of the Law Visiting Faculty

External links
 Omar Dajani: "September Song", Foreign Policy (24 May 2011) at ForeignPolicy.com
 Omar Dajani & Ezzedine Choukri Fishere: "The Myth of Defensible Borders: How a Regional Security Initiative Can Promote Middle East Peace", Foreign Affairs (5 Jan 2011) at ForeignAffairs.com
 Omar Dajani: "In Middle East's problems lie the solutions", The San Francisco Chronicle (3 August 2006) at SFGate.com
 Omar Dajani: "On a Better Road This Time in the Mideast?", The Washington Post (4 May 2003) at Common Ground News Service - Middle East

Living people
American people of Palestinian descent
Northwestern University alumni
Yale Law School alumni
University of the Pacific (United States) faculty
1970 births
American legal scholars